Sir Henry Peter Francis Swinnerton-Dyer, 16th Baronet,  (2 August 1927 – 26 December 2018) was an English mathematician specialising in number theory at the University of Cambridge. As a mathematician he was best known for his part in the Birch and Swinnerton-Dyer conjecture relating algebraic properties of elliptic curves to special values of L-functions, which was developed with Bryan Birch during the first half of the 1960s with the help of machine computation, and for his work on the Titan operating system.

Biography
Swinnerton-Dyer was the son of Sir Leonard Schroeder Swinnerton Dyer, 15th Baronet, and his wife Barbara, daughter of Hereward Brackenbury. He was educated at the Dragon School in Oxford, Eton College and Trinity College, Cambridge, where he was supervised by J. E. Littlewood, and spent a year abroad as a Commonwealth Fund Fellow at the University of Chicago. He was later made a Fellow of Trinity, and was Master of St Catharine's College from 1973 to 1983 and vice-chancellor of the University of Cambridge from 1979 to 1981. In 1983 he was made an Honorary Fellow of St Catharine's.

In that same year, he became Chairman of the University Grants Committee and then from 1989, Chief Executive of its successor, the Universities Funding Council.

He was elected Fellow of the Royal Society in 1967 and was made a KBE in 1987. In 1981, he was awarded an Honorary Degree (Doctor of Science) by the University of Bath. In 2006 he was awarded the Sylvester Medal, and also the Pólya Prize (LMS).

Swinnerton-Dyer was, in his younger days, an international bridge player, representing the British team twice in the European Open teams championship. In 1953 at Helsinki he was partnered by Dimmie Fleming: the team came second out of fifteen teams. In 1962 he was partnered by Ken Barbour; the team came fourth out of twelve teams at Beirut.

He married Dr Harriet Crawford in 1983.

Death

Swinnerton-Dyer died on 26 December 2018 at the age of 91.

Books
.
.

See also
 List of Masters of St Catharine's College, Cambridge
 List of Vice-Chancellors of the University of Cambridge
 Littlewood conjecture
 Rank of a partition
 Swinnerton-Dyer polynomials

Notes

External links

 Number Theory and Algebraic Geometry -- to Peter Swinnerton-Dyer on his 75th birthday, edited by Miles Reid and Alexei Skorobogatov, LMS Lecture Notes 303, Cambridge University Press, 2004 
 
 
 Interviewed by Alan Macfarlane 12 May 2008 (video)

1927 births
2018 deaths
Alumni of Trinity College, Cambridge
Dyer, Henry Peter Francis Swinnerton-Dyer, 16th Baronet
British and Irish contract bridge players
Cambridge mathematicians
English mathematicians
Fellows of the Royal Society
Fellows of Trinity College, Cambridge
Knights Commander of the Order of the British Empire
Masters of St Catharine's College, Cambridge
Vice-Chancellors of the University of Cambridge